Christian Omar Tovar Delgado (born 13 January 1996) is a Mexican professional footballer who plays as a midfielder for Yalmakán.

Club career

Early career
After playing for local club Tiburones Rojos, Tovar rose through the Santos Laguna youth ranks, playing 64 matches (11 goals) total for the U15, U17 and U20 teams. In February, he played in the 2013 Torneo di Viareggio, an annual international youth tournament in Italy, and scored a goal in a 5-0 group stage win over Rijeka. He participated in the 2014 and 2015 versions as well. Santos also won the 2013 Liga MX U20 Torneo Apertura in December 2013.

Professional career
Tovar was promoted to the Santos first team, and immediately loaned out to second division team Zacatepec in June 2015. He made his professional debut in a 1–1 draw on 31 July 2015 against Cimarrones de Sonora, where he got a yellow card. After a successful loan spell with Zacatepec, Santos loaned Tovar to Tampico Madero.

Tovar signed with Alacranes de Durango in June 2022.

International career
Tovar was selected to represent his country at the 2013 CONCACAF U-17 Championship. He played in one match, a 2-0 group stage win over Honduras. Mexico won the tournament, qualifying for the 2013 FIFA U-17 World Cup.

At the World Cup, Tovar played in six games (one as a starter), registering two assists. His first came in the 6-1 group stage loss vs. Nigeria, and then again in the 2–0 win against Italy in the Round of 16. Mexico eventually lost in the final.

Honours

National team
Mexico U17
CONCACAF U-17 Championship
Champion : 2013
FIFA U-17 World Cup
runner-up : 2013

References

External links
 
 National team profile
 Ascenso MX profile

1996 births
Living people
Mexico youth international footballers
Association football midfielders
Club Atlético Zacatepec players
Tampico Madero F.C. footballers
Alebrijes de Oaxaca players
Gavilanes de Matamoros footballers
Alacranes de Durango footballers
Ascenso MX players
Liga de Expansión MX players
Liga Premier de México players
Footballers from Coahuila
Mexican footballers
Sportspeople from Saltillo